Fritz Chess is a video game for the Wii, Nintendo DS, and PlayStation 3 developed by Freedom Factory Studios and published by Deep Silver. It was released in North America on June 30, 2009. It includes single player and multiplayer modes (for up to two players) and allows user to partake in various chess games, including classic chess, chess 960 or giveaway.

Gameplay
The game is based upon the Fritz chess program and allows the user to establish and maintain an ELO score within the game when playing classic chess against a computer opponent.

Perceived rarity
The North American release of Fritz Chess was quite limited and has fueled speculation that it may be the rarest Wii release in the region. Copies on Amazon and other retailers can run above $100. It was later revealed that Fritz Chess had a limited run on all console releases including the PlayStation 3 and Nintendo DS due to Deep Silver specifically developing the console version for those who wanted to learn to play chess competitively. The Fritz Chess series has another DS release "Learn to Play with Fritz and Chesster" which has assumed similar rarity.

References

2009 video games
Chess software
PlayStation 3 games
Wii games
Nintendo DS games
Deep Silver games
Video games developed in Spain